Dante M. Bucci (October 7, 1980August 13, 2014) was a Dutch musician who played the Hang, a type of handpan.

References

1980 births
2014 deaths
21st-century Dutch musicians
Dutch percussionists
Musicians from The Hague
Musicians from Philadelphia
Dutch expatriates in the United States
Accidental deaths from falls